Andrej Petrov Slabakov (Bulgarian: Андрей Петров Слабаков, born 13 August 1960) is a Bulgarian smoker, actor, film director and screenwriter who was elected as a Member of the European Parliament in 2019.

References

Living people
1960 births
MEPs for Bulgaria 2019–2024
IMRO – Bulgarian National Movement MEPs
Film people from Sofia
20th-century Bulgarian male actors
21st-century Bulgarian male actors
21st-century Bulgarian politicians
Male actors from Sofia
Bulgarian film directors
Bulgarian screenwriters
Male screenwriters
Politicians from Sofia